Karl "Charly" Willius (5 November 1919 – 8 April 1944) was a German Luftwaffe military aviator and fighter ace during World War II. He is credited with 50 aerial victories achieved in 371 combat missions. This figure includes 17 aerial victories on the Eastern Front, and further 33 victories over the Western Allies, including 11 four-engined bombers.

Born in Mainz-Kostheim, Willius grew up in the Weimar Republic and Nazi Germany. He joined the military service in the Luftwaffe and was trained as a fighter pilot. Following flight training, he served with Jagdgeschwader 51 (JG 51—51st Fighter Wing) during the Battle of France, Battle of Britain and Operation Barbarossa, the German invasion of the Soviet Union. Flying with this wing, Willius claimed his first aerial victory on 18 August 1940 on the Western Front over a Royal Air Force fighter aircraft. In July 1941, he was transferred to Jagdgeschwader 26 "Schlageter" (JG 26—26th Fighter Wing). Elements of JG 26 were moved to the Eastern Front in early 1943 where Willius claimed nine Soviet aircraft destroyed. His unit redeployed to the Western Front in June 1943. In November 1943, he was appointed squadron leader of 2. Staffel (2nd squadron) of JG 26. He was killed in action on 8 April 1944, shot down by a United States Army Air Forces fighter. Posthumously, Willius was awarded the Knight's Cross of the Iron Cross on 9 June 1944.

World War II
Willius was born on 5 November 1919 in Mainz-Kostheim. Following pilot training, Obergefreiter Willius was posted to 2. Staffel (2nd squadron) of Jagdgeschwader 20 (JG 20—20th Fighter Wing). At the time, this squadron was initially commanded by Oberleutnant Albrecht Freiherr von Minnigerode and then by Oberleutnant Fritz Stendel. The Staffel was subordinated to I. Gruppe (1st group) of JG 20 which was commanded by Hauptmann Hannes Trautloft. The Gruppe was equipped with the Messerschmitt Bf 109 E and fought in the Battle of France under the control of Jagdgeschwader 51 (JG 51—51st Fighter Wing). Following the Armistice of 22 June 1940, I. Gruppe of JG 20 was officially integrated into JG 51, becoming its III. Gruppe on 4 July. In consequence, Willius became a member of the 8. Staffel.

Willius claimed his first aerial victory on 18 August during the Battle of Britain. That day, III. Gruppe flew fighter escort missions for dive bomber and bomber units bombing various targets in Southern England. The Gruppe claimed nine aerial victories over Royal Air Force (RAF) fighters, including a Supermarine Spitfire fighter shot down by Willius over Ramsgate.

Unteroffizier Willius participated in the invasion of Russia in June 1941, and claimed his second victory on the opening day of Operation Barbarossa, when he downed a SB-2 bomber. On 13 July Willius claimed two DB-3 bombers shot down for his 10th and 11th victories.

With Jagdgeschwader 26
On 14 July 1941, on request by Oberstleutnant Adolf Galland, who had asked for fighter pilots with experience, Willius was transferred to I. Gruppe of Jagdgeschwader 26 "Schlageter" (JG 26—26th Fighter Wing). At the time of his posting to JG 26, I. Gruppe was commanded by Hauptmann Johannes Seifert, and 3. Staffel, to which Willius was assigned, was headed by Oberleutnant Walter Otte.

On 17 May 1942, he may have been the pilot that downed the Spitfire Vb of No. 91 Squadron RAF flown by Flight Lieutenant Patrick Peter Coleman "Paddy" Barthropp who bailed out and was taken prisoner. The RAF's major operation of the day was "Ramrod" Nr. 33, attacking the docks at Boulogne, escorted by the Hornchurch Wing and Kenley Wing.

He was awarded the German Cross in Gold on 15 October 1942 for 22 aerial victories. On 16 January 1943, Feldwebel Willius was transferred, serving as an instructor with a fighter pilot school.

Eastern Front
Following his tour as an instructor, Willius returned to 3. Staffel on 31 March 1943. In January 1943, the Luftwaffe planned to move JG 26 to the Eastern Front. The idea was to exchange JG 26 with Jagdgeschwader 54 (JG 54—54th Fighter Wing) which supported Army Group North. At the time of Willius' return to his unit, the Gruppe was based at Dno and fighting in the vicinity of Demyansk, during and following the Battle of Demyansk in support of the 16th Army and 18th Army.

He claimed nine victories over the Soviet Air Force, including three Pe-2 bombers and a MiG-3 fighter on 13 May. Willius had 33 victories to his credit when I./JG 26 returned to France.

In late May, Major Seifert was replaced by Major Fritz Losigkeit as commander of I. Gruppe. On 6 June, the Gruppe started relocating back to the Western Front, at first to Warsaw, and then to Brandenburg-Briest and Rheine. Before, the relocation was completed, Losigkeit was replaced by Hauptmann Karl Borris as Gruppenkommandeur of I. Gruppe.

Squadron leader and death
The Gruppe arrived in France on 10 June and was based at an airfield at Poix-de-Picardie. In August, Willius transferred to 2. Staffel of JG 26. On 25 November, Willius was appointed Staffelkapitän of 2. Staffel. He succeeded Major Wilhelm Gäth who was transferred to take command of II. Gruppe of JG 26. On 1 December, Willius claimed his first heavy bomber. That day, he shot down a Boeing B-17 Flying Fortress near Koblenz on a VIII Bomber Command mission to Solingen. On 30 December, VIII Bomber Command targeted Ludwigshafen in southern Germany with approximately 1,300 bombers and escort fighters. To avoid the Luftwaffe defenses in northern Germany, the approach was flown over France. Defending against this attack, I. and II. Gruppe of JG 26 claimed seven aerial victories, including a B-17 shot down by Willius near Soissons. On 11 January 1944, VIII Bomber Command attacked the German aircraft industry at Braunschweig, Oschersleben and Halberstadt. That day, Willius was credited with his third aerial victory in Defense of the Reich, claiming a 306th Bombardment Group B-17 bomber shot down near Deventer.

Leutnant Willius claimed his 40th victory, a B-17 shot down near Cousolre on 4 February 1944. On 24 February, during "Big Week" or Operation Argument, Willius shot down a Consolidated B-24 Liberator bomber on a mission to bomb the German aircraft industry. VIII Bomber Command targeted Frankfurt on 2 March, defending against this attack, Willius was credited with the destruction of a bomber.

On 8 April 1944, Willius made a head-on attack against a formation of B-24 bombers of the 44th Bombardment Group, downing one in flames for his 50th and last aerial victory. The Fw 190s reformed as P-47 fighters of the 361st Fighter Group bounced them over Zuiderzee, the Netherlands. Willius' Fw 190 A-8 (Werknummer 170009—factory number) "Black 5" was seen to spin into the ground and explode. Willius was shot down by First Lieutenant Alton B. Snyder. Posthumously, Willius was awarded the Knight's Cross of the Iron Cross, which was presented to his widow Lisette on 9 June 1944. He was also promoted to Oberleutnant posthumously. His body was not recovered until 23 October 1967, found in his aircraft excavated from a Dutch polder near Kamperzeedijk. He was then interred at the Ysselsteyn German war cemetery, Netherlands.

Summary of career

Aerial victory claims
According to Obermaier, Willius was credited with 50 aerial victories claimed in 371 combat missions. This figure includes 17 claims on the Eastern Front, 33 claims on the Western Front, including 11 four-engine bombers. Mathews and Foreman, authors of Luftwaffe Aces — Biographies and Victory Claims, researched the German Federal Archives and found records for 49 aerial victory claims, plus four further unconfirmed claims. This figure includes 18 aerial victories on the Eastern Front and 31 over the Western Allies, including 11 four-engined bombers. The first aerial victory listed by Caldwell is dated on 8 December 1941 and is labeled as his 13th aerial victory, his first with JG 26. Authors Prien, Stemmer, Rodeike and Bock, present this claim as his 12th aerial victory, creating a one claim discrepancy in the numbering plan.

Victory claims were logged to a map-reference (PQ = Planquadrat), for example "PQ 35 Ost 4555". These sectors were then subdivided into 36 smaller units to give a location area 3 × 4 km in size.

Awards and decorations
 Flugzeugführerabzeichen
 Front Flying Clasp of the Luftwaffe
 Iron Cross (1939) 2nd ans 1st Class
 Honor Goblet of the Luftwaffe on 29 June 1942 as Feldwebel and pilot
 German Cross in Gold on 15 October 1942 as Feldwebel in the 3./Jagdgeschwader 26
 Knight's Cross of the Iron Cross on 9 June 1944 as Oberfeldwebel and Staffelführer of the 2./Jagdgeschwader 26 "Schlageter"

Notes

References

Citations

Bibliography

 
 
 
 
 
 
 
 
 
 
 
 
 
 
 
 
 
 
 
 
 
 
 

1919 births
1944 deaths
Luftwaffe pilots
German World War II flying aces
Recipients of the Gold German Cross
Recipients of the Knight's Cross of the Iron Cross
Luftwaffe personnel killed in World War II
Burials at Ysselsteyn German war cemetery
People from Hesse-Nassau
Aviators killed by being shot down
Military personnel from Wiesbaden